Irène Vernal (14 July 1912 – September 2008) was a Belgian actress.

She was born in Antwerp, Belgium. She played at the Rideau de Bruxelles and at the National Theater of Belgium. She was awarded as the Eve of the Theatre (Ève du Théâtre) for her role in the play The Rose Tattoo at Rideau de Bruxelles.

Theater 

 1938: Jean Racine Bérénice at the Théâtre royal du Parc
 1952: Tennessee Williams The Rose Tattoo, directed by Maurice Vaneau, Rideau de Bruxelles
 1989: George Bernard Shaw  Pygmalion directed by Jean-Pierre Rey, Théâtre royal des Galeries

Filmographie 
 1967 : Le Mariage de mademoiselle Beulemans 
 1970 : Peace in the Fields

External links 
 Her roles at the La Bellone homepage
 Ses rôles at the Asp@sia
 

Belgian stage actresses
20th-century Belgian actresses
1912 births
Actors from Antwerp
2008 deaths
Belgian film actresses